Eleazar was son of Pinhas associated with the priests in taking charge of the sacred vessels brought back to Jerusalem after the Babylonian Exile (Ezra 8:33).

Hebrew Bible people